Sebastiania hexaptera is a species of flowering plant in the family Euphorbiaceae. It was described in 1902. It is native to Guadeloupe, Dominica, and Martinique.

References

Plants described in 1902
Flora of Guadeloupe
Flora of Dominica
Flora of Martinique
hexaptera